A flying roller coaster is a type of roller coaster meant to simulate the sensations of flight by harnessing riders in a prone position during the duration of the ride. The roller coaster cars are suspended below the track, with riders secured such that their backs are parallel to the track.

History
The flying roller coaster is a relatively new concept. The world's first flying roller coaster was Skytrak, built in Manchester, United Kingdom at the Granada Studios Tour in 1997. The Skytrak used a single-passenger car. Riders would climb into the car in much the same fashion as climbing a ladder, then the car would be raised up to the track before being dispatched. The single-passenger design kept the ride's capacity low, at only 240 riders per hour. The park, and Skytrak itself, were short-lived; both closed in 1998.

Design

Vekoma

Dutch roller coaster manufacturer Vekoma constructed the first large-scale flying roller coaster, Stealth, for California's Great America in 2000. Nicknamed the 'Flying Dutchman' by Vekoma, Stealth featured a higher-capacity train with four-across seating. Riders load the trains in an upright sitting position, facing the rear of the train. After the train is fully loaded, a mechanism in the station lower the seats to the track, with the riders on their backs facing the ceiling. After cresting the lift hill, the track twists 180 degrees to flip the riders into the flying position for the rest of the ride. Just prior to reaching the roller coaster's final brake run, the track twists again, such that riders are lying on their backs facing upward. After reaching the station, the seats are raised back to loading position.
The harness system for the Vekoma flying roller coaster consists of two main elements: the lap bar and the chest harness. After being seated, the operator pulls down the lap bar, which is hinged on the floor of the train. The bar locks into slots in the sides of the seat and secures the waist. Halfway up the bar is a pair of leg restraints, which hold the legs in place during the ride. The rider then fastens the buckles to close the chest harness and secure the upper body. Hand grips are placed at the ends of the arm rests of each seat.
Vekoma would expand upon the 'Flying Dutchman' prototype with two other installations in 2001, Batwing for Six Flags America and X-Flight for Geauga Lake. Of the three Vekoma Flying Dutchmans, only Batwing still operates at its original location: Stealth was relocated to Carowinds and renamed BORG Assimilator from 2004 to 2007, and now operates as Nighthawk, while X-Flight operated at Kings Island as Firehawk until October 28, 2018.

Vekoma has also designed a new, more compact flying roller coaster model nicknamed the 'Stingray'. Its first installation is at theSuzhou Giant Wheel Park in Suzhou, China, which opened on August 18, 2009. The ride was removed in 2018.

Vekoma's flying roller coasters have a 54-inch minimum-height requirement.

Bolliger & Mabillard 

Swiss manufacturer B&M debuted their flying coaster model Air in 2002, jointly developed with ride designer John Wardley.
Riders take a seating position like on a regular inverted coaster with a chest harness and leglocks. They are then tilted 90° so they assume a frontwards lying position

Zamperla 

Italy's Zamperla produces a flying roller coaster model dubbed 'Volare' (Italian for "to fly"). Riders lie down in the cars, which hang from an upper rail at a 45 degree angle. The car is then lifted up into a flying position while holding the riders inside. This model is very compact and affordable (estimated to be US$6 million) and comes with a unique spiral lift hill in which a tall spinning column with 2 vertical poles connected to it push the cars up the spiral track.

Installations

References 

 
Types of roller coaster